Marcel Spilliaert (4 November 1924 - 17 October 1992) was a French male water polo player. He was a member of the France men's national water polo team. He competed with the team at the 1948 Summer Olympics.

References

External links
 

1924 births
1992 deaths
French male water polo players
Water polo players at the 1948 Summer Olympics
Olympic water polo players of France
Sportspeople from Tourcoing
20th-century French people